Sami District is one of the districts of the Central River Division of the Gambia. In the 2013 census, it had a population of 24,429.

References 

Central River Division
Districts of the Gambia